Otrick Island is a member of the Arctic Archipelago in the territory of Nunavut. The uninhabited island lies in Peel Sound, south of Somerset Island's Four Rivers Bay. The equally small Barth Island is to the south.

References

External links 
 Otrick Island in the Atlas of Canada - Toporama; Natural Resources Canada

Uninhabited islands of Qikiqtaaluk Region